The ribbon competition for rhythmic gymnastics at the 2019 Southeast Asian Games in Philippines was held from 6 to 7 December 2019 at Rizal Memorial Coliseum.

Schedule 
All times are Philippine Standard Time (UTC+8).

Results

Qualification

Final

Source:

References

Ribbon